Şəlvə is a village in the Lachin District of Azerbaijan.

History 
The village was located in the Armenian-occupied territories surrounding Nagorno-Karabakh, coming under the control of ethnic Armenian forces during the First Nagorno-Karabakh War in the early 1990s. The village subsequently became part of the breakaway Republic of Artsakh as part of its Kashatagh Province, where it was known as Shalua. It was returned to Azerbaijan as part of the 2020 Nagorno-Karabakh ceasefire agreement.

Historical heritage sites 
Historical heritage sites in and around the village include a grave field from between the 1st and 13th centuries, a medieval bridge, a 12th/13th-century khachkar, a tombstone from 1629, two 17th-century tombstones, five 17th-century khachkars, a 17th/18th-century stele, and the 17th-century church of Poghos-Petros.

References

External links 
 

Populated places in Lachin District